Shahrak-e Seyyed Ala ol Din Hoseyn (also Romanized as Shahrak-e Seyyed ‘Alā ol Dīn Ḩoseyn) is a village in Qarah Bagh Rural District, in the Central District of Shiraz County, Fars Province, Iran. At the 2006 census, its population was 707, in 184 families.

References 

Populated places in Shiraz County